Porúbka (until 1899 ) is a village and municipality in Žilina District in the Žilina Region of northern Slovakia.

History
In historical records the village was first mentioned in 1362.

Geography
The municipality lies at an altitude of 387 metres and covers an area of 3.452 km². It has a population of about 455 people.

External links
http://www.statistics.sk/mosmis/eng/run.html

Villages and municipalities in Žilina District